Phil Manning may refer to:

 Phil Manning (footballer) (1906–1930), Australian rules footballer
 Phil Manning (musician) (born 1948), Australian blues musician
Phil Manning (palaeontologist), British television palaeontologist and author at the University of Manchester.

See also
Manning (surname)